Liplje may refer to:

 Liplje Monastery, an Orthodox monastery near Teslić, Bosnia and Herzegovina
 Liplje, Kamnik, a village in Slovenia
 Liplje, Ljig, a village in Serbia
 Liplje, Postojna, a village in Slovenia
 Liplje, Vrbovsko, a settlement in the municipality of Vrbovsko, Croatia
 Liplje, Zvornik, a mountain village near Zvornik, Bosnia and Herzegovina
 Liplje camp, concentration camp in operation in Liplje village during the Bosnian War